Pennepack Baptist Church — also known as Pennepek Baptist Church and Lower Dublin Baptist Church — is a historic Baptist church in Bustleton, Philadelphia, Pennsylvania, USA, that is one of the oldest Baptist congregations in North America. It is situated in the 23rd Ward of Philadelphia, by Pennepek [Pennypack] Creek.

The church congregation was founded in 1688 by Elias Keach, the son of Benjamin Keach, as the first Baptist church in Pennsylvania. The church was originally Calvinist (Reformed) in theology. The current church building was constructed in 1805 on the site of two earlier church buildings dating back to 1707. Ebenezer Kinnersley, a notable scientist, served as minister for a period in the 1700s. The church still meets weekly.

See also
Baptists in the United States

References

External links

Pennepack Baptist Church … 325 Years and Counting, Hidden City Philadelphia, 2013

Baptist churches in Pennsylvania
Churches in Philadelphia
1688 establishments in Pennsylvania
Churches completed in 1805
Northeast Philadelphia